Hewitsonia kuehnei is a butterfly in the family Lycaenidae. It is found in Kenya, Tanzania and Uganda.

References

Butterflies described in 2008
Poritiinae